Ryan's Four is an American medical drama television series that aired from April 5 until April 27, 1983.

Premise
A doctor acts as a guide for four interns at a medical center.

Cast
Tom Skerritt as Dr. Ryan Thomas
Lisa Eilbacher as Dr. Ingrid Sorenson
Tim Daly as Dr. Ryan Gilliian
Albert Hall as Dr. Ryan Watson
Dirk Blocker as Dr. Ryan Rostov
Nicolas Coster as Dr. Ryan Whitford

US television ratings

Episodes

References

External links
 
TV Guide
epguides.com

1983 American television series debuts
1983 American television series endings
1980s American drama television series
1980s American medical television series
English-language television shows
American Broadcasting Company original programming
Television series by CBS Studios
Television shows set in Baltimore